Devgan is a surname native to India.

Notable people with the surname include:

Anirudh Devgan
 Ajay Devgn (born Ajay Devgan, 1969), Indian actor
 Amish Devgan (born 1980), Indian news anchor
 Anil Devgan (1969–2020), Indian director and screenwriter, son of Veeru
 Veeru Devgan (1934–2019), Indian stunt director

Indian surnames
Surnames of Indian origin
Punjabi-language surnames
Hindu surnames